Abidah is a sub-district located in Yarim District, Ibb Governorate, Yemen. Abidah had a population of 5285 as of  2004.

References 

Sub-districts in Yarim District